, is a light novel series written by DesuYo and illustrated by Sahiko. The light novel series has been published on June 30, 2020 by Sacraneco under its light novel imprint, Sacraneco LN. The series was released on Amazon Kindle, Google Play Books, Apple Books, and Kobo platforms.

Plot 
This series revolves in the world where magic exist. There are humans born with and without magic. The ones are born with are called Mages. In this world, students with magic-born attend to magic academy to pursue their dream in becoming a graduated Mage, that is known as the Ivory Mage. There is a renowned magic academy, Hiroko Academy that is located in a sovereign country called Iasharia, where it is become a tradition in accepting high-grade students to further their studies in magic.

It started of with Kizuki Izumi which was transferred to the magic academy, and later befriended with one the best high-ranked Ivory Mage to be, Naomi Ishikawa--together along with her best friend, Yuki Fujita. Kizuki's enrollment into the magic academy sparks controversy as the academy only accepts female students, although it was said that male student is eligible for the enrollment.

As the story goes, soon they will found themselves engaged with something that they were not supposed to. The world holds a great darkest past and all of that are beyond their imagination. What else will they found themselves involved with in the future?

Characters

Kizuki Izumi is a 23-year-old young man with an average height, just got himself transferred into a magic academy which hardly accepting boys for its enrollment. He then later befriended with a beautiful long-haired girl, Naomi Ishikawa with an unfortunate turn of events. After few unwanted occasions, he started making friends with few other of his new schoolmates as well. Kizuki is seemingly does not have a particular magic affinity. As days goes by since his enrollment into the magic academy, the atmosphere of the magic academy started to change as things getting peculiar to a certain extent.

A beautiful long fiery-red haired girl that is a descendant of a renowned noble family, the Ishikawa Family, in Iasharia. She is well known for her achievement in her excellence in studies, in tournaments and others. She possesses a fire magic affinity. Naomi spent most of her time in the academy with her close friend, Yuki Fujita. Naomi easily gets irritated with the new transferred student, Kizuki Izumi for some reason, although they had things for each other.

A blond well-endowed girl with blue-coloured eyes and with a twin-tailed hairstyle. Yuki is one of Naomi's close friend and she is her classmate as well. Yuki is also born in the noble family. Her appearance can be easily distinguish as she gave out an obvious ojousama mien. Yuki possess a magic affinity of ice.

A petite girl with a hairstyle that was styled into a cat's ear shaped. She belongs to the Imperial Kitano Family. Long short story, she is a princess. She was transferred from her previous magic academy into the current one which the Hiroko Academy due to unknown circumstances. Most of the time she appears emotionless even though she is happy or sad. 

Noriko Kurahashi is a young-looking woman in her twenties. She is in the same boat as Kizuki whereby they are working under the same agency to tackle underlying issues regarding internal conflict of Iasharia, the country they are in. Noriko also held a position in the Hiroko Academy as a principal.

Ryouta is a tall young man with his glasses on. He knew Kizuki Izumi for years. Both of them been working together for a long time despite a fundamental dislike between both of them. Even though Ryouta can be seen reposed most of the time, when it comes to his tasks, he always get the job done.

Media

Light novels

Notes

References

External links
  at Amazon 
  at Google Books 
  at Apple Books 
  at Kobo 
  at Mahou no Sekai 
  at 魔法のセカイ 

2020 Japanese novels
Anime and manga based on light novels
Book series introduced in 2020
Light novels first published online
Light novels
Monarchy in fiction
Shōnen manga
Sword and sorcery anime and manga